Saanich South is a provincial electoral district for the Legislative Assembly of British Columbia, Canada.  It was created by 1990 legislation dividing the previous two-member district of Saanich and the Islands which came into effect for the 1991 B.C. election. Between 1966 and 1991, the riding was dominated by Social Credit, who won every election except for 1972 when the riding was won by the British Columbia Progressive Conservative Party.

Since 1991, the riding has been won by the NDP in every election except for the BC Liberal landslide victory in 2001. During the 1990s, the riding was represented by prominent Cabinet minister, Andrew Petter, who served in the Harcourt, Clark, and Dosanjh governments.

Demographics

Geography
Saanich South covers the northern and western portions of the District of Saanich.  Neighbourhoods within the electoral district include Cordova Bay, Prospect Lake, Royal Oak, Broadmead, Strawberry Vale, Glanford, North Quadra, and Blenkinsop Valley.

History

Member of Legislative Assembly
The MLA for Saanich South is Lana Popham, a farmer, small-business person and environmentalist. She was first elected in 2009 and represents the British Columbia New Democratic Party.

Election results

References

External links
 BC Stats Profile - 2001
 Results of 2001 election (pdf)
 2001 Expenditures
 Results of 1996 election
 1996 Expenditures
 Results of 1991 election
 1991 Expenditures
 Website of the Legislative Assembly of British Columbia

British Columbia provincial electoral districts on Vancouver Island
Saanich, British Columbia